Lord Henry Frederick Thynne PC DL (2 August 1832 – 28 January 1904) was a British Conservative politician. He served under Benjamin Disraeli as Treasurer of the Household between 1875 and 1880.

Background
Thynne was the second son of Henry Thynne, 3rd Marquess of Bath, and his wife the Honourable Harriet Baring, daughter of Alexander Baring, 1st Baron Ashburton. John Thynne, 4th Marquess of Bath, was his elder brother.

Political career
Thynne entered the House of Commons in 1859 as Member of Parliament for South Wiltshire, a seat he held until 1885, and served under Benjamin Disraeli as Treasurer of the Household from 1875 to 1880. In 1876 he was admitted to the Privy Council. Apart from his political career he was also a Major in the Wiltshire Yeomanry Cavalry and a Deputy Lieutenant for Wiltshire.

Family
Thynne married on 1 June 1858 Lady Ulrica Frederica Jane Seymour, daughter of Edward Seymour, 12th Duke of Somerset. They had four sons and two daughters:
Thomas Ulric Thynne (b.1861), Royal Navy officer; m. 1898 Dorothy Mary Warner, daughter of Charles William Warner, CB
John Alexander Roger Thynne (b.1864)
Colonel Ulric Oliver Thynne, DSO (1871–1957), British Army officer; m. 1899 Marjory Wormald, daughter of Edward Wormald, and had issue
Oliver St Maur Thynne (b.1901)
Alice Rachel Thynne
Alice Ruth Hermione Thynne; m. 1889 Alexander Edward Lane Fox-Pitt Rivers

Lord Henry died in January 1904, aged 71. Lady Ulrica survived him by twelve years and died in January 1916.

References

External links 
 

1832 births
1904 deaths
Members of the Parliament of the United Kingdom for English constituencies
Members of the Privy Council of the United Kingdom
Younger sons of marquesses
UK MPs 1859–1865
UK MPs 1865–1868
UK MPs 1868–1874
UK MPs 1874–1880
UK MPs 1880–1885
Deputy Lieutenants of Wiltshire
Treasurers of the Household
Henry
Royal Wiltshire Yeomanry officers